The Estonian Afghanistan Contingent or (simply Afghanistan Contingent) was a joint military force of the Estonian Defence Forces deployed mainly in the southern region of Afghanistan, Helmand province in Now Zad area.

Current deployments 

This the order of battle of the known units that are operating within the Estonian Afghanistan Contingent:
 ESTCOY-14 infantry company
 NSE-13 logistical unit
 CPT diplomatic unit
 CST air-field unit
 Artillery battalion mortar unit

History 
Estonia has participated in Afghanistan since March 2003 under the NATO mission International Security Assistance Force (ISAF) in Afghanistan. The first Estonians to rotate in the country were an anti-landmine team in Kabul. In 2005 most of the Estonian units were relocated into northern Afghanistan in Mazar-e-Sharif province and in 2006 into the Helmand province in south Afghanistan.

Former deployments 
This the order of battle of the known units that have operated within the Estonian Afghanistan Contingent:

 EODT-12 pioneer platoon
 EODT-11 pioneer platoon
 EODT-10 pioneer platoon
 EODT-9 pioneer platoon
 EODT-8 pioneer platoon
 EODT-7 pioneer platoon
 EODT-6 pioneer platoon
 EODT-5 pioneer platoon
 EODT-4 pioneer platoon
 EODT-3 pioneer platoon
 EODT-2 pioneer platoon
 EODT-1 pioneer platoon

 ESTCOY-14 infantry company: 2012
 ESTCOY-13 infantry company: 2012
 ESTCOY-12 infantry company: 2011
 ESTCOY-11 infantry company: 2011
 ESTCOY-10 infantry company: 2010
 ESTCOY-9 infantry company: 2010
 ESTCOY-8 infantry company: 2009
 ESTCOY-7 infantry company: 2009
 ESTCOY-E infantry company: 2009
 ESTCOY-6 infantry company: 2008
 ESTCOY-5 infantry company: 2008
 ESTCOY-4 infantry company: 2007
 ESTCOY-3 infantry company: 2007
 ESTCOY-2 infantry company: 2006
 ESTCOY-1 infantry company: 2006

 NSE-6
 NSE-5
 NSE-4
 NSE-3
 NSE-2
 NSE-1

See also 
Estonian Iraqi Contingent
Estonian Kosovo Contingent
International Security Assistance Force
List of Estonian Contingencies

References 

Military units and formations of Estonia
International Security Assistance Force